Ruffins is a surname. Notable people with the surname include:

Kermit Ruffins (born 1964), American musician, singer, composer, and actor
Moqut Ruffins (born 1984), American football player
Reynold Ruffins (1930–2021), American artist

See also
Ruffin (disambiguation)
Ruffini